Bruno Bulić (born 6 March 1958) is a Yugoslav former cyclist. He competed at the 1980 Summer Olympics and the 1984 Summer Olympics.

References

External links
 

1958 births
Living people
Yugoslav male cyclists
Olympic cyclists of Yugoslavia
Cyclists at the 1980 Summer Olympics
Cyclists at the 1984 Summer Olympics
Sportspeople from Pula